Belfast, Northern Ireland has over forty public parks. The Forest of Belfast is a partnership between government and local groups, set up in 1992 to manage and conserve the city's parks and open spaces. They have also commissioned more than 30 public sculptures since 1993. In 2006, the City Council also set aside £8 million to continue this work. The Belfast Naturalists' Field Club was founded in 1863 and is administered by National Museums and Galleries of Northern Ireland.

One of the most popular parks is Botanic Gardens in the Queen's Quarter. Built in the 1830s and designed by Sir Charles Lanyon, Botanic Gardens Palm House is one of the earliest examples of a curvilinear and cast iron glasshouse. Attractions in the park also include the Tropical Ravine, a humid jungle glen built in 1889, rose gardens and public events ranging from live opera broadcasts to pop concerts. U2 played here in 1997 and the Tennents Vital festival takes place in the gardens each summer.

Sir Thomas and Lady Dixon Park, to the south of the city centre, attracts thousands of visitors each year to its International Rose Garden. Rose Week in July each year boasts over 20,000 blooms.

Woodvale Park is traditional City Park, which provides a range of passive and active recreation. The main facilities include Bowling Greens, Soccer pitches, a Kick about area and Play area. A network of paths through rolling lawns, shrubs borders and mature trees link these facilities. Historically Woodvale Park has been one of the main parks for the 26,000 people who make up the Greater Shankill area, due to regeneration in the area the population is increasing.

History

Woodvale Park became Belfast's fourth public park when it opened in 1888. The land was bought by Belfast Corporation from Reverend Glover. He had lived in a house called Woodville that once stood in the park. The park was due to be called Shankill Park, but the name was changed to Woodvale at the last minute. The opening was set for 3.00pm on Saturday 18 August 1888. By 3.35pm the dignitaries had not turned up and so one of the rangers took the key admit the large crowd.  The park included a large pond, which was used by local people in wintertime for skating. Cricket was first played in the park in 1894, although the authorities were wary of possible injury to other park users. The pond was filled in after the Second World War and a children's playground established in its place.

Full list

See also

List of parks in Northern Ireland

References

External links
 Belfast City Council - Parks and open spaces

 
 
Parks and gardens
Belfast
Belfast